Girija Keer (5 February 1933—31 October 2019) was an Indian Marathi language writer from Maharashtra state. She started her career as a school teacher in a village. Keer had written around 115 books in Marathi Language in the fields of novels, short stories, travelogues, and literature for children.

Following a six-year research involving interviews with prisoners undergoing life imprisonment at Yerawada prison near Pune, she recently published a book titled Janmathep.

Keer has received awards for her works. Some of them include the Pune Marathi Library's Kamalabai Tilak Award, the Abhiruchi Award and the Shri Akshar dhan Mahila Sahitya Award from Mumbai.

Death 
Keer died on 30 October 2019 at her Mumbai residence due to Ill health.

References

External links 
The following web pages list some of her books:
 https://openlibrary.org/a/OL207589A/Girija-Keer
 http://www.rasik.com/cgi_bin/display_author.cgi?authorId=a60765&lang=marathi
 http://majesticprakashan.com/?q=byauthor&op0=OR&filter0
https://archive.today/20140127204225/http://girijakeer.in/

Marathi-language writers
1933 births
2019 deaths